The 2022 Open d'Orléans was a professional tennis tournament played on indoor hard courts. It was the seventeenth edition of the tournament which was part of the 2022 ATP Challenger Tour. It took place in Orléans, France between 26 September and 2 October 2022.

Singles main-draw entrants

Seeds

 1 Rankings are as of 19 September 2022.

Other entrants
The following players received wildcards into the singles main draw:
  Richard Gasquet
  Harold Mayot
  Corentin Moutet

The following players received entry into the singles main draw as special exempts:
  Adrian Andreev
  Nerman Fatić

The following player received entry into the singles main draw as an alternate:
  Skander Mansouri

The following players received entry from the qualifying draw:
  Ulises Blanch
  Joris De Loore
  Arthur Fils
  Maxime Janvier
  Mats Rosenkranz
  Lukáš Rosol

Champions

Singles

  Grégoire Barrère def.  Quentin Halys 4–6, 6–3, 6–4.

Doubles

  Nicolas Mahut /  Édouard Roger-Vasselin def.  Michael Geerts /  Skander Mansouri 6–2, 6–4.

References

2022 ATP Challenger Tour
2022
2022 in French tennis
September 2022 sports events in France
October 2022 sports events in France